Irina Valeryevna Shaykhlislamova (born 6 January 1986), known professionally as Irina Shayk, is a Russian model and television personality who received international recognition when she appeared as the first Russian model on the cover of the 2011 Sports Illustrated Swimsuit Issue. Models.com ranks her as one of the New Supers.

Early life 
Shayk was born in Yemanzhelinsk (Chelyabinsk Oblast region), Soviet Union, to a Volga Tatar father, Valery Shaykhlislamov, a coal miner, and ethnic Russian mother, Olga, a kindergarten music teacher. She has stated that she inherited her looks from her father and that people often mistake her for being South American, saying, "My father was dark skinned, because he was Tatar, sometimes Tatars can look Brazilian. I get my light eyes from my mother." She has one sibling, a sister named Tatiana Petenkova. She is also an aunt to Tatiana's three children including a niece named "Irina" after her.

Shayk started playing piano at age six. At age nine, she enrolled in a music school and studied there for seven years, both playing the piano and singing in the choir, since her mother wanted her to study music. Her father died of complications of pneumonia when she was 14, leaving her family with little money and forcing her mother to work two jobs to provide for the family.

After high school, Shayk studied marketing but later instead chose to enter a beauty school with her older sister. While there, she was noticed by a person from a local modeling agency who was struck by her beauty. She was urged to participate in the "Miss Chelyabinsk 2004" beauty contest, which she won; she described this contest as far below the standard of beauty contests one would expect in metropolitan European cities or in the United States.

Career

Modeling

2007–2010: Early years

In 2007, Shayk replaced Ana Beatriz Barros as the face of Intimissimi, and in the same year debuted in the annual Sports Illustrated Swimsuit Issue.

After being the face of Intimissimi for three years, Shayk was made the official ambassador for the brand in 2010. Her other modeling campaigns included Beach Bunny Swimwear, and Guess for the spring/summer 2009 season. Other work includes the Victoria's Secret catalog, Lacoste, Cesare Paciotti and Morellato. She signed with IMG Models in May 2009.

2011–2015: Mainstream success 
Shayk modeled the Armani Exchange spring/summer 2010 campaign. She also starred in Kanye West's "Power", directed by artist Marco Brambilla. She was on the cover of Ocean Drive and GQ South Africa for the August issue. She ranked first in the "50 Hottest Russian Women" list by Complex magazine.

She made a change from swimwear to high fashion with a spread in Spain's Harper's Bazaar and landed the cover of Elle Spain for their November 2010 issue. Glamour Spain awarded her "Best International Model of 2010". At the end of the year, she was pictured nude in the GQ Spain December issue; however, she claimed that she had not stripped for the photoshoot, and that the magazine had digitally altered the images to remove her lingerie. GQ responded that there are 15 witnesses of her posing nude.

On Valentine's Day, in an episode of the Late Show with David Letterman, it was revealed via Billboard that Shayk was the covermodel for the 2011 Sports Illustrated Swimsuit Issue. This was the fifth time she has been featured in the magazine, but the first time she has been on the cover. She is the first Russian to appear on the cover. Shayk became the face of swim label Luli Fama's 2011 advertising campaign and look book. In 2011, she covered magazines such as Tatler Russia, Twelv, Cosmopolitan Spain, GQ Mexico, Glamour Spain, Amica Italy and appeared on the covered of Elle Spain, the special edition for Christmas. She also worked for many brands like Rampage, replacing Bar Refaeli, Replay and XTI.
 she ranked 14th in the "Top 20 Sexiest Models" list on Models.com.
The same year, she was voted "Sexiest Woman In The World" in the Hungarian magazine Periodika.

In 2012, she covered Esquire UK, Harper's Bazaar Arabia and Ukraine, Marie Claire Ukraine, Spain and Russia, GQ Germany, Glamour Russia and appeared on 14 Cosmopolitan spring covers worldwide. She also covered S Moda Spain and The Sunday Times Style. She also did an editorial for Vanity Fair Italy. The same year, she has appeared in campaigns for Morellato, Agua Bendita and Blanco.

In November, Shayk covered Twelv Magazine, Second Issue with fellow Russian model Anne V.
In the same month, she appeared in an editorial for Vogue Spain December issue working with Mario Testino.

In February 2013, she covered Vs. magazine with Anne V and the same month she did an editorial for CR Fashion book issue 2 photographed by Bruce Weber and styled by Carine Roitfeld. The same month, she did the runway of Jeremy Scott during the New York fashion week. In March 2013, she did the runway of Givenchy during the Paris fashion week. Also in 2013, Shayk featured several times in Harper's Bazaar US. She featured for the second time in CR fashion book issue 3. In September, she covered Allure Russia. She was also the cover model of Vogue Spain, landing her first Vogue cover photographed by Giampaolo Sgura. In 2014, she was the placard bearer for the Russian team during the opening ceremony of the 2014 Winter Olympics.

2016–present: Transition to high fashion work 
Shayk has walked the runways for Miu Miu, Bottega Veneta, Marc Jacobs, Chanel, Ralph Lauren , Schiaparelli, Mugler,  Moschino, Burberry, Versace, Givenchy, Diane Von Furstenberg, Giles Deacon, Desigual, Jeremy Scott, Hugo Boss, Philipp Plein, Salvatore Ferragamo, Tory Burch, Victoria Beckham, Valentino, Max Mara, Brandon Maxwell, Isabel Marant, Etro, Vivienne Westwood, Richard Quinn,  Oscar de la Renta, Vivienne Westwood, Missoni, Michael Kors,   and Mango. She even walked for the last Jean Paul Gaultier fashion show in 2020. In 2016, she walked in the Victoria's Secret Fashion Show while 6 months pregnant with baby girl Lea de Seine Shayk Cooper.

She has appeared in advertising campaigns for Burberry, Jean Paul Gaultier, Marc Jacobs, Versace, Alberta Ferretti, Givenchy, Missoni, La Perla, Roberto Cavalli, Giorgio Armani, Dsquared2, La Senza, Morellato, Bebe, Lord & Taylor, Lacoste, Armani Exchange, Guess?, Blumarine, Saks Fifth Avenue, Victoria's Secret, and Avon.
In October 2015, she became the new L'Oréal Paris International Spokesperson.

Acting 
Shayk made her acting debut as Megara alongside Dwayne Johnson in the 2014 film Hercules.

Personal life 
Shayk dated Linkin Park drummer Rob Bourdon from 2007 to 2009. She met Portuguese footballer Cristiano Ronaldo in 2009 and they started dating soon after. She ended the relationship with Ronaldo in January 2015.

In spring 2015, she started dating American actor Bradley Cooper. Their daughter Lea De Seine was born in Los Angeles on March 21, 2017. The couple split up in June 2019.

Philanthropy 
Shayk is helping a maternity hospital in her hometown of Yemanzhelinsk. She and her sister helped rebuild the children's ward of the local hospital, and now Shayk raises money on behalf of a Russian charity, Pomogi - "Help", which provides care to sick children. Shayk is the official ambassador for Pomogi in Russia.

She is an ambassador for the Food Bank for New York City as well as the ASPCA.

She is against the 2022 Russian invasion of Ukraine, has stated an intention of donating to UNICEF and Red Cross to support their humanitarian efforts in Ukraine, and has asked her followers to donate too.

Filmography

Music videos

Video games

Web series

Awards and nominations

References

External links 

 
 
 
 
 

1986 births
Living people
People from Chelyabinsk Oblast
Russian female models
Russian television personalities
Russian expatriates in the United States
The Lions (agency) models
Elite Model Management models
Association footballers' wives and girlfriends
Russian activists against the 2022 Russian invasion of Ukraine
Russian people of Tatar descent